Pima County Natural Resources, Parks and Recreation is the agency within Pima County, Arizona that manages the natural resources, parks, and recreation offerings within Pima County including Tucson, AZ.

History
The agency was established by the county as the Parks and Recreation Department in 1947 with the intended goal of serving "urban and rural residents and guests by providing leisure-time destinations and services."

Parks
NRPR manages 51 parks with the majority located in or near Tucson. Ajo's parks include Ajo Regional Park, E.S. Bud Walker Park, Forrest Rickard Park, and Palo Verde II Park. Green Valley's parks include Canoa Preserve Park and Canoa Ranch.

Tucson Region

River Parks and Greenways
 The Loop (metro river park system)
 Cañada del Oro River Park
 Harrison Greenway
 Julian Wash Greenway
 Pantano River Park
 Rillito River Park
 Santa Cruz River Park

Trailheads
 36th Street Trailhead
 Abrego Trailhead
 Agua Caliente Hill South Trailhead
 Avenida de Suzenu Trailhead
 Bear Canyon Trailhead
 Camino de Oeste Trailhead
 Campbell TrailheadCentral Arizona Project Trailhead
 Colossal Cave Road Trailhead
 David Yetman West Trailhead
 El Camino del Cerro Trailhead
 Explorer Trailhead
 Gabe Zimmerman Davidson Canyon Trailhead
 Gates Pass Trailhead
 Iris Dewhirst Pima Canyon Trailhead
 King Canyon Trailhead
 Richard Genser Starr Pass Trailhead
 Richard McKee Finger Rock Trailhead
 Sarasota Trailhead
 Sweetwater Preserve Trailhead
 Ventana Canyon Trailhead

Community Centers
The NRPR has 13 community centers:
 Ajo Community Center
 Arivaca Community Center
 Catalina Community Center
 Centro Del Sur Community Center and Boxing Gym
 Continental Community Center
 Drexel Heights Community Center
 Ellie Towne Flowing Wells Community Center
 John A. Valenzuela Youth Center
 Littletown Community Center
 Mt. Lemmon Community Center
 Northwest YMCA Pima County Community Center
 Picture Rocks Community Center
 Robles Ranch Community Center

Pools and Splash Pads
The NRPR has 10 pools and 2 splash pads community centers:
 Ajo Pool
 Brandi Fenton Splash Pad
 Catalina Pool
 Flowing Wells Pool
 Kino Pool (Mulcahy YMCA)
 Los Niños Pool (Augie Acuña)
 Manzanita Pool Park
 Picture Rocks Pool and Splash Pad
 Thad Terry Pool (Northwest YMCA)
 Wade McLean Pool (Marana High School Pool)

Shooting and Archery Ranges
 Southeast Archery Range
 Southeast Clay Target Center
 Southeast Regional Park Shooting Range
 Tucson Mountain Park Archery Range
 Tucson Mountain Park Rifle and Pistol Range
 Virgil Ellis Shooting Range (located at Ajo Regional Park)

References

Parks in Arizona
Parks in Pima County, Arizona
Geography of Tucson, Arizona
Tourist attractions in Tucson, Arizona